Trina Marie Jackson (born February 16, 1977), also known by her married name as Trina Falca, is an American former competition swimmer who represented the United States at the 1996 Summer Olympics in Atlanta, Georgia.  Jackson won a gold medal as a member of the first-place U.S. team in the women's 4×200-meter freestyle relay, together with teammates Jenny Thompson, Cristina Teuscher and Sheila Taormina.  The four Americans set a new Olympic record of 7:59.87 in the event final.   She missed a bronze in the individual 200 freestyle by just 0.01 to Dagmar Hase.

For high school, Jackson attended the Bolles School, a private prep school in Jacksonville, Florida, where she swam for coach Gregg Troy's Bolles high school swim team, a program with a reputation for producing future international swimmers and Olympians.  She graduated from the Bolles School in 1995.

See also
 List of Olympic medalists in swimming (women)
 List of University of Arizona people

References

External links
 
 

1977 births
Living people
American female freestyle swimmers
Arizona Wildcats women's swimmers
Medalists at the FINA World Swimming Championships (25 m)
Olympic gold medalists for the United States in swimming
Sportspeople from Jacksonville, Florida
Swimmers at the 1995 Pan American Games
Swimmers at the 1996 Summer Olympics
Medalists at the 1996 Summer Olympics
Pan American Games gold medalists for the United States
Pan American Games medalists in swimming
Bolles School alumni
Medalists at the 1995 Pan American Games
20th-century American women
21st-century American women